The white-bellied spinetail (Mazaria propinqua) is a species of bird in the family Furnariidae. It is found in river islands of the western Amazon Basin. Its natural habitat is subtropical or tropical moist shrubland. 

This species was originally placed in the genus Synallaxis but when molecular phylogenetic studies found that it was not closely related to the other members of the genus it was moved to its own monotypic genus Mazaria.

Within the ovenbird family, the white-bellied spinetail is genetically most closely related to the chotoy spinetail (Schoeniophylax phryganophilus). The species is monotypic: no subspecies are recognised.

References

Birds of the Amazon Basin
Birds of the Ecuadorian Amazon
Birds of the Peruvian Amazon
white-bellied spinetail
Taxonomy articles created by Polbot